Alexander Dunn (born 13 September 1998)  is a Scottish badminton player. Born in Bellshill, Dunn started playing badminton at aged seven, and joined the national team in 2009. He won a bronze medal at the 2015 European Junior Championships in the boys' doubles event with his partner Adam Hall, also the silver medal in the mixed doubles event with Eleanor O'Donnell in 2017. He competed at the 2018 Commonwealth Games in Gold Coast.

Dunn educated sport and physical activity at the University of Strathclyde, in Glasgow.

Achievements

European Championships 
Men's doubles

European Junior Championships 
Boys' doubles

Mixed doubles

BWF International Challenge/Series (6 titles, 2 runner-up) 
Men's doubles

Mixed doubles

  BWF International Challenge tournament
  BWF International Series tournament
  BWF Future Series tournament

References

External links 
 
 

1998 births
Living people
Sportspeople from Bellshill
Scottish male badminton players
Badminton players at the 2018 Commonwealth Games
Badminton players at the 2022 Commonwealth Games
Commonwealth Games competitors for Scotland